Kelvin Mateus de Oliveira (born 1 June 1993), known simply as Kelvin, is a Brazilian professional footballer who plays as a right winger for FC Ryukyu in J2 League. 

He played for five of the Campeonato Brasileiro Série A's Big Twelve, as well as three other clubs in Série B. Abroad, he represented Porto, where he contributed to a Primeira Liga title in 2013.

Club career

Early years and Porto
Born in Curitiba, Paraná, Kelvin spent two seasons with local Paraná Clube in the Série B. In late June 2011, aged only 18, he signed with FC Porto in Portugal.

Together with teammate Christian Atsu, Kelvin was sent on loan to fellow Primeira Liga club Rio Ave F.C. for the 2011–12 campaign. He made his debut in the competition on 21 August 2011, in a 1–0 away loss to Académica de Coimbra.

Kelvin returned to Porto for 2012–13, spending most of the season with the reserves in the Segunda Liga. He managed to score, however, three important goals for the first team as a substitute, helping to home wins against S.C. Braga (3–1) and S.L. Benfica (2–1), the latter coming in the 92nd minute.

Loans
On 13 January 2015, Kelvin joined Sociedade Esportiva Palmeiras on a loan deal. He played five games as they won the Copa do Brasil that year, and scored in a 5–1 home victory (6–2 aggregate) in the second leg of the second round against Sampaio Corrêa Futebol Clube on 12 May.

Kelvin moved to São Paulo FC, also on loan, on 2 February 2016. On 6 April, he recorded the first continental goal of his career, in a 6–0 home thrashing of Venezuela's Trujillanos F.C. in the group stage of the Copa Libertadores. He scored once in the national league on 11 September, opening a 3–1 defeat of Figueirense FC.

On 3 February 2017, Kelvin was loaned to CR Vasco da Gama. Limited by injury in his first year in Rio de Janeiro, he nonetheless had his link extended the following January; he scored once on 5 May 2018 to conclude a 4–1 win over América Futebol Clube after coming on as a substitute.

Later career
In late April 2019, free agent Kelvin signed with Fluminense FC until the end of the season. He left three months later having played for only two minutes, agreeing to a contract at Coritiba Foot Ball Club. In nine games for his hometown team in the second tier he scored once, to open a 2–0 victory at Grêmio Esportivo Brasil on 12 November; this was his first strike in 18 months.

On 5 February 2020, having won promotion with Coritiba, Kelvin joined Avaí FC on a one-year deal. He was released on 21 May, having made four goalless appearances, so that the club could add Renato to their payroll. In August, he began training with the club again, who had retained his registration.

Kelvin returned to the top flight on 6 October 2020, with strugglers Botafogo de Futebol e Regatas; he signed to the end of the season, with the option of two more. The following 5 March, following their relegation, he joined Vila Nova Futebol Clube also in division two.

In June 2022, Kelvin was unveiled as FC Ryukyu's new signing. During his time at the club, he was partially paid in cryptocurrency.

Honours
Porto
Primeira Liga: 2012–13
Supertaça Cândido de Oliveira: 2013
Taça da Liga runner-up: 2012–13

Palmeiras
Copa do Brasil: 2015

References

External links

1993 births
Living people
Brazilian footballers
Footballers from Curitiba
Association football wingers
Campeonato Brasileiro Série A players
Campeonato Brasileiro Série B players
Paraná Clube players
Sociedade Esportiva Palmeiras players
São Paulo FC players
CR Vasco da Gama players
Fluminense FC players
Coritiba Foot Ball Club players
Avaí FC players
Botafogo de Futebol e Regatas players
Vila Nova Futebol Clube players
Primeira Liga players
Liga Portugal 2 players
FC Porto B players
Rio Ave F.C. players
FC Porto players
Club Always Ready players
J2 League players
FC Ryukyu players
Brazilian expatriate footballers
Expatriate footballers in Portugal
Expatriate footballers in Bolivia
Expatriate footballers in Japan
Brazilian expatriate sportspeople in Portugal
Brazilian expatriate sportspeople in Bolivia
Brazilian expatriate sportspeople in Japan